On December 5, 2012, Generro Sanchez was murdered in Asher, Oklahoma by Jerrod Murray, a fellow student at East Central University. While Sanchez gave Murray a ride to Walmart in exchange for gas money, Murray pulled a gun on Sanchez and fired a total of three rounds, the first missing and the other two hitting Sanchez in the head. Murray was charged with first-degree murder and found not guilty by reason of insanity. Murray is currently at a state facility receiving mental health treatment.

Background 
Generro Sanchez and Jerrod Murray (born ) were both freshman students at East Central University. Murray revealed to investigators that he planned to kill someone for weeks up to the murder, simply to know what it felt like to have killed someone. He selected Sanchez as his victim.

Murder 
On December 5, 2012, Murray convinced Sanchez to give him a ride to Walmart in exchange for $20. Once they arrived in the Walmart parking lot, Murray pulled out a .40-caliber Springfield handgun, stolen from Asher resident Daniel Davis. He ordered Sanchez to drive north of Asher. Sanchez panicked; to ease his mind, Murray unloaded the weapon and placed the magazine in Sanchez's lap. However, unbeknownst to Sanchez, Murray had another magazine in his pocket, which he pulled out and placed on his own lap.

They arrived on Substation Road where Murray quickly loaded the weapon and fired two rounds at Sanchez; the first missed, the second struck him in the head. The vehicle drifted off the road and struck a tree in a ditch. Murray exited the vehicle and dragged Sanchez out of the driver's seat to the ground, where he was still breathing. Murray fired another round into his head, killing him. He proceeded to cover the corpse with dirt, leaves, and a single stick.

A driver on the same road pulled over and spoke with Murray, who said he had run off the side of the road and needed help getting his truck out of the ditch. The driver gave Murray a ride to his grandparents' house, where he called his roommate for help. The roommate called his own parents, but they didn't answer. Murray walked to his roommate's parents' house, where he was given  a can of WD-40 by his roommate's father, in the hope it could remove his fingerprints from the crime scene.

Murray was given a ride by his roommate's father back to an abandoned house near the crime scene with the WD-40, where he then walked towards the victim's truck, cutting through a woodlot south of Substation Road. As he got closer to the scene, a cough alerted him to someone's presence; he believed the cough sounded like the man who had given him a ride earlier. As it turned out, the man had examined the scene further, discovered Sanchez's body, and called police to report a gunshot victim. 

Immediately changing plans, Murray walked east towards US-177 and tried to hitchhike to Canada. Mistaking a Pottawatomie County Sheriff Department car for a non-police vehicle, Murray flagged it down. Undersheriff Travis Palmer took him into custody, and Murray immediately confessed to the murder. He was later found not guilty by reason of insanity.

References 

2012 murders in the United States
2012 deaths
December 2012 crimes in the United States
Deaths by firearm in Oklahoma
December 2012 events in the United States